USS Fair (DE-35) was an Evarts-class destroyer escort of the United States Navy.

Namesake
Victor Norman Fair, Jr. was born on 15 August 1921 in Lincoln County, North Carolina. He enlisted in the United States Naval Reserve on 15 August 1940, and was commissioned ensign on 14 March 1941.

Construction and commissioning
Fair was launched on 27 July 1943 by Mare Island Navy Yard; sponsored by Mrs. V. N. Fair, Jr., widow of Lieutenant Fair; and commissioned on 23 October 1943.

Service history

World War II
Fair escorted a convoy from San Francisco to Pearl Harbor, where she arrived on 9 January 1944. She put to sea nine days later to conduct an antisubmarine patrol off Tarawa, and late on 4 February, joined  to develop a contact previously made by the destroyer. Attacks by both ships led to the sinking of what was probably Japanese submarine I-175 the next morning. Fair returned to Pearl Harbor on 17 February, and sailed on 25 February for Majuro, where from 5 March – 12 June, she patrolled the entrance to the lagoon, and escorted ships to and from ocean rendezvous and Roi Namur. On 14 June, she arrived at Eniwetok with three oilers, and for the next 2 weeks, screened them in the fueling area off the Mariana Islands as they fueled ships serving in the assault and capture of Saipan.

The escort vessel served on patrol out of Eniwetok from 1–14 July, then returned to screen the logistics group during the assaults on Tinian and Guam. She returned to Pearl Harbor on 31 August for a brief overhaul and to take part in training operations. On 13 October, Fair was back at Eniwetok for duty escorting convoys to Ulithi until 19 January 1945. She continued her escort duty from Eniwetok to Manus, Guam, and Guadalcanal until 24 March, when she arrived at Ulithi to stage for the assault on Okinawa.

Guarding a convoy composed primarily of LSTs, Fair put out from Ulithi on 27 March, and after the initial assault on 1 April, put into Kerama Retto. On 6 April, before getting underway for Saipan with unladen transports, she fired on the massive wave of kamikazes which attacked shipping off the island, splashing one. After her voyage to Saipan, Fair patrolled off Chimu Wan, Okinawa until 12 May, then screened the transport area, firing on attacking aircraft and suicide boats for 10 days. Her next assignment was a convoy escort voyage to Saipan and Guam, returning to Okinawa on 10 June for local escort duty and patrol.

Fair cleared Okinawa on 5 July 1945 for a West Coast overhaul. She was decommissioned at Portland, Oregon on 17 November, and transferred to the United States Army on 20 May 1947.

Awards

References

External links

NavSource Online: Destroyer Escort Photo Archive – USS Fair (DE-35)
Ships of the U.S. Navy, 1940–1945   DE-35 USS Fair
Combat Chronology of the US Navy Forces in operations against and from the Marshall Islands
uboat.net – Allied Warships – Evarts class Destroyer Escorts
DE Action And Damage Timeline of World War II
Destroyers OnLine – The Destroyer Escorts

Evarts-class destroyer escorts
World War II frigates and destroyer escorts of the United States
Ships built in Vallejo, California
1943 ships